Praealticus poptae, the Marianas rockskipper, is a species of combtooth blenny found in coral reefs in the western central Pacific ocean, around the Mariana Islands.  This species grows to a length of  SL. The specific name honours the Dutch ichthyologist and curator Canna Maria Louise Popta (1860-1929) of the  Rijksmuseum van Natuurlijke Historie in Leiden.

References

poptae
Taxa named by Henry Weed Fowler
Fish described in 1925